Rear Admiral William Anthony George Dovers,  (born 19 September 1951) is a retired senior officer of the Royal Australian Navy.

Early life
Bill Dovers was educated at Newington College (1959–1969), commencing as a preparatory school student in Wyvern House, before entering the Royal Australian Naval College in 1970.

Naval career
He received the Conspicuous Service Cross in 1991 in recognition of his command of  during the Gulf War.

References

1951 births
Australian military personnel of the Gulf War
Graduates of the Royal Australian Naval College
Living people
People educated at Newington College
Recipients of the Conspicuous Service Cross (Australia)
Royal Australian Navy admirals